Point St. George is a location in Del Norte County, California along the Pacific Ocean. St. George Reef Light is located offshore as is Point St. George Reef Offshore State Marine Conservation Area.

References 

Landforms of Del Norte County, California
Peninsulas of California